Richard McTaggart, MBE (born 15 October 1935) is a Scottish retired amateur boxer. He competed in the 1956 and 1960 Olympics in the lightweight  division and won a gold and a bronze medal, respectively. In 1956 he received the Val Barker Trophy for best boxing style at the Olympics. At the 1964 Olympics McTaggart moved to the light-welterweight category, but lost in the third bout to the eventual winner Jerzy Kulej. McTaggart won the British ABA title in 1956, 1958, 1960, 1963 and 1965, and retired with a record of 610 wins out of 634 bouts.

McTaggart was appointed Member of the Order of the British Empire (MBE) in the 1985 Birthday Honours for services to amateur boxing in Scotland.

In retirement McTaggart worked as a boxing coach and prepared the Scottish team to the 1990 Commonwealth Games. In 2002 he was inducted into the Scottish Sports Hall of Fame. His four brothers were also amateur boxers.

Achievements

1956 Olympic results 
 Round of 32: bye
 Round of 16: defeated Chandrasena Jayasuriya (Ceylon) by decision
 Quarterfinal: defeated Andre Vairolatto (France) by decision
 Semifinal: defeated: Anatoly Lagetko (Soviet Union) by decision
 Final: defeated Harry Kurschat (West Germany) by decision (won gold medal)

Awards and honors
Order of the British Empire – Member (MBE)
Member of the International Boxing Hall of Fame
Member of the Scottish Sports Hall of Fame
 Val Barker Trophy (1956)
Lifetime Achievement Award - Team Scotland Sports Awards

References

External links

 
 Profile, databaseOlympics; accessed 20 November 2015.

1935 births
Living people
Lightweight boxers
Olympic gold medallists for Great Britain
Olympic bronze medallists for Great Britain
Olympic boxers of Great Britain
Boxers at the 1956 Summer Olympics
Boxers at the 1960 Summer Olympics
Boxers at the 1964 Summer Olympics
Commonwealth Games gold medallists for Scotland
Boxers at the 1958 British Empire and Commonwealth Games
Boxers at the 1962 British Empire and Commonwealth Games
Olympic medalists in boxing
Sportspeople from Dundee
Scottish male boxers
Scottish Olympic medallists
Members of the Order of the British Empire
Medalists at the 1960 Summer Olympics
Medalists at the 1956 Summer Olympics
Commonwealth Games medallists in boxing
Medallists at the 1958 British Empire and Commonwealth Games
Medallists at the 1962 British Empire and Commonwealth Games